The 2011–12 Eastern Counties Football League season (known as the 2011–12 Thurlow Nunn Eastern Counties Football League for sponsorship reasons) was the 70th in the history of Eastern Counties Football League a football competition in England.

Premier Division

The Premier Division featured 19 clubs which competed in the division last season, along with two new clubs, promoted from Division One:
Diss Town
Gorleston

League table

Results

Division One

Division One featured 14 clubs which competed in the division last season, along with two new clubs:
Brightlingsea Regent, promoted from the Essex and Suffolk Border Football League
Debenham LC, relegated from the Premier Division

League table

Results

References

External links
 Eastern Counties Football League

2011-12
9